John B. Keefe, Sr. (May 28, 1928 – March 11, 1997) was an American lawyer, politician, and judge.

Early life 
Keefe was born in Chicago, Illinois. He graduated from Washburn High School in Minneapolis. Keefe served in the United States Army in 1946 and 1947. Keefe went to Macalester College. He received his bachelor's degree from University of Minnesota and his law degree from William Mitchell College of Law. He lived with his wife and family in Hopkins, Minnesota and practiced law.

Career 
He served as the municipal judge for the city of Hopkins. Keffe served in the Minnesota House of Representatives from 1976 to 1972 and in the Minnesota Senate from 1973 to 1982. He was a Republican. He then served in the Hennepin County Commission from 1984 to 1994.

Death 
He died at his home in North Key Largo, Florida from a heart attack.

Notes

1928 births
1997 deaths
Lawyers from Chicago
Politicians from Chicago
People from Hopkins, Minnesota
Military personnel from Minnesota
Minnesota lawyers
Macalester College alumni
University of Minnesota alumni
William Mitchell College of Law alumni
Minnesota state court judges
Republican Party members of the Minnesota House of Representatives
Republican Party Minnesota state senators
County commissioners in Minnesota